Colonel Matareti Sarasau is a Fijian politician and military figure. He is a former member of the Senate of Fiji and represented Kadavu Province.

References

I-Taukei Fijian members of the Senate (Fiji)
Living people
Year of birth missing (living people)
Fijian soldiers
Politicians from Kadavu Province
Place of birth missing (living people)